Fjell Church is a parish church of the Church of Norway in Øygarden Municipality in Vestland county, Norway. It is located in thevillage of Fjell on the island of Sotra. It is one of the three churches for the Fjell parish which is part of the Vesthordland prosti (deanery) in the Diocese of Bjørgvin. The white, wooden church was built in a long church design in 1874 using plans drawn up by the architect Conrad Fredrik von der Lippe. The church seats about 700 people.

History
The earliest existing historical records of the church date back to the year 1330, but the church was not new that year. The first church at Fjell was a wooden stave church that was likely built during the 13th century. Sometime during the 1600s, but before 1686, the old medieval church was torn down. A new timber-framed long church was built on the same site to replace it. In 1725, the church was sold into private ownership. The new owner was Abraham Wessel from Bergen. In 1795, the old nave was torn down and a new nave was rebuilt on the same site. (An alternate theory mentioned in one source is that the church was only renovated in the 1600s, and that the stave church was torn down and replaced in 1795.)

Ownership of the church changed hands several times over the years and in 1869, the church was sold back to the parish by the Krohn family. Shortly thereafter, in 1871, the parish decided that the present church was too small and it needed to replace that church. The new church was designed by the architect Conrad Fredrik von der Lippe and Ole Syslak from Lindås was hired as the lead builder for the project. The new church was consecrated on 28 August 1874. About one year after the new church was completed, the old church was torn down and that area was turned into a cemetery. In 1971–1972, a large wing was built to the west of the nave which houses a parish hall. This addition was designed by Torgeir Alvsaker and Einar Vaardal-Lunde.

Media gallery

See also
List of churches in Bjørgvin

References

Øygarden
Churches in Vestland
Long churches in Norway
Wooden churches in Norway
19th-century Church of Norway church buildings
Churches completed in 1874
13th-century establishments in Norway